Le Château de l'Aéroport is an abandoned resort themed hotel at the Mirabel International Airport in Mirabel, Quebec, Canada. Located next to where the airport's passenger terminal building once stood, it was connected via a skyway (still left standing after the demolition of terminal). The hotel closed in 2002.

History

Early years

Construction on "Le Château de l'Aéroport" began in June 1975, and the hotel opened on December 3, 1977, operated by Canadian Pacific Hotels. 

The property was developed along the same visual lines as other CP Hotels properties of the era, including the Chateau Airport Calgary and the Red Oak Inns of Thunder Bay and Peterborough.  It had a large indoor atrium style foyer with fully grown palm trees, garden foliage, swimming pool and heated whirlpool; over which most rooms looked. It also had a glass elevator and terraced restaurant. High season was November to May. It accommodated passengers arriving and departing from the adjoining Mirabel Airport, with the 344 room and 11 suite complex located directly adjacent to the airport terminal and its above ground parking area.

Closure and abandonment
The hotel was a victim of the airport's decline. On August 26, 2002, facing high vacancies due to Mirabel Airport's dwindling usage, it closed after 25 years in service. Mirabel was eventually closed for passenger traffic in 2004. The building has been abandoned for over two decades. 

In February 2011,  it was announced that the hotel would reopen. Syscomax, a construction and management company, signed a long term lease with Montreal Airport ADM to operate the hotel. Renovations were started on the adjacent eight-storey administration building, with plans for it to be used by aerospace companies. Plans for first a 2012 and then a 2014 reopening fell through, as renovation work was never begun. In November 2014, a Aeroports de Montreal announced a decision to demolish the adjacent airport terminal building and outdoor parking structures. Demolition work was completed in 2016, leaving just the hotel and its connecting skyway standing. The hotel has since been boarded up and left to deteriorate.

References

External links
Exterior pictures of Le Château de l'Aéroport in 2004
Interior pictures of Le Château de l'Aéroport
Archive of official site: (January 1999) * (January 2002)

Hotel buildings completed in 1977
Hotels established in 1977
Defunct hotels in Canada
Hotels in Quebec
Canadian Pacific Railway hotels
Buildings and structures in Laurentides
Montréal–Mirabel International Airport